Romano Piancastelli (born 24 August 1940) is an Italian racing cyclist. He rode in the 1964 Tour de France.

References

External links
 

1940 births
Living people
Italian male cyclists
Place of birth missing (living people)
Sportspeople from the Province of Ravenna
Cyclists from Emilia-Romagna